Per Magnus Steiring (born 7 February 1997) is a Norwegian footballer who plays as a centre-back for Skeid.

Career
He hails from Valnesfjord, and made his debut for FK Fauske/Sprint in 2012. Following trials with RSC Anderlecht, Tromsø IL and Bodø/Glimt, Steiring opted to join Rosenborg BK ahead of the 2014 season. He made his senior debut in a friendly match in January 2014, but did not become a fixture in the first team.

In 2015, he featured in the first two rounds of the Norwegian Football Cup, which Rosenborg eventually won. He also captained the senior B team and won the Norwegian cup with the junior team. In 2016, he again played the first two rounds of the Norwegian Football Cup. In the summer, he was loaned out to Viking FK, and made his Norwegian Premier League debut as a substitute in August 2016, against Rosenborg nonetheless.

In January 2017, he signed for Sogndal. In September 2020, he signed a two-and-a-half-year contract with Kongsvinger. In August 2022, he moved to Skeid.

Career statistics

Honours

Club
 Rosenborg
Norwegian Football Cup (2): 2015, 2016
Norwegian U-19 Championship (1): 2015

References

1997 births
Living people
People from Fauske
Norwegian footballers
Rosenborg BK players
Viking FK players
Sogndal Fotball players
Mjøndalen IF players
Kongsvinger IL Toppfotball players
Skeid Fotball players
Eliteserien players
Norwegian First Division players
Norwegian Second Division players
Norway youth international footballers
Sportspeople from Bodø
Association football defenders